WRBR-FM (103.9 MHz) is a radio station serving the South Bend, Indiana market and broadcasting an active rock format. Licensed to South Bend, Indiana, United States, WRBR-FM hosts several concerts and activities in the South Bend area. WRBR-FM was formerly an oldies station before switching to an active rock format.

History
WRBR first signed on the air in 1965 as a Top 40 station. Its Top 40 format lasted until 1981 when its call letters changed to WXMG and flipped to adult contemporary. In 1984, their call letters changed to WZZP, and would later flip back to its Top 40/CHR format in 1988 competing against WNDU-FM. A few years later in 1991, the station returned back its original WRBR call letters. WRBR dropped CHR in 1993 for an oldies format which lasted until 1998 and flipped to its current rock format.

Sources
http://www.fcc.gov/fcc-bin/fmq?list=0&facid=27145

External links

RBR-FM
Active rock radio stations in the United States